Igoh Ogbu (born 8 February 2000) is a Nigerian professional footballer who plays as a centre-back for Czech First League club Slavia Prague.

Club career
Ogbu started his career with Gombe United in Nigeria, before joining Norwegian club Rosenborg in February 2018, where he signed a four-year contract. Following loan spells with Levanger and Sogndal, Ogbu joined the latter permanently in June 2020. On 29 January 2021, he joined Lillestrøm on a five-year contract. He made his Eliteserien debut on 16 May 2021 against Strømsgodset. On 6 January 2023, he joined Slavia Prague on a three-year contract.

International career
Ogbu featured for the Nigeria under-20 team at the 2019 Africa U-20 Cup of Nations and the 2019 FIFA U-20 World Cup, making a total of seven appearances.

Career statistics

References

2000 births
Living people
Sportspeople from Jos
Nigerian footballers
Nigeria under-20 international footballers
Gombe United F.C. players
Rosenborg BK players
Levanger FK players
Sogndal Fotball players
Lillestrøm SK players
Norwegian First Division players
Eliteserien players
Nigerian expatriate footballers
Nigerian expatriate sportspeople in Norway
Expatriate footballers in Norway
Association football defenders
SK Slavia Prague players
Expatriate footballers in the Czech Republic
Nigerian expatriate sportspeople in the Czech Republic